Wesley Andrew Charpie (born November 4, 1992) is an American soccer player who currently plays for Louisville City in the USL Championship.

Career

College and amateur
Charpie spent his entire college career at the University of South Florida.  He made a total of 81 appearances for the Bulls and tallied five goals and 21 assists.

Charpie also played in the Premier Development League for Reading United.

Professional
On January 15, 2015, Charpie was selected in the second round (29th overall) of the 2015 MLS SuperDraft by Toronto FC.  However, he ended up signing with USL affiliate club Toronto FC II.  On March 21, he made his professional debut in a 3–2 defeat to Charleston Battery.

On November 22, 2016, Saint Louis FC has agreed to a contract with midfielder Octavio Guzmán, defender Wesley Charpie, and midfielder Mats Bjurman, pending United Soccer League and United States Soccer Federation approval.

References

External links
South Florida Bulls bio

1992 births
Living people
American soccer players
American expatriate soccer players
Association football defenders
Expatriate soccer players in Canada
Jacksonville Armada FC players
Louisville City FC players
Memphis 901 FC players
People from Tarpon Springs, Florida
Reading United A.C. players
Saint Louis FC players
Soccer players from Florida
South Florida Bulls men's soccer players
Sportspeople from Pinellas County, Florida
Toronto FC draft picks
Toronto FC II players
USL League Two players
USL Championship players